The Anglican Diocese of Isiala-Ngwa is one of nine within the Anglican Province of Aba, itself one of 14 provinces within the Church of Nigeria: bishops of the diocese include the late Owen Azubuike and the current incumbent Temple Nwaogu.

Notes

Church of Nigeria dioceses
Dioceses of the Province of Aba